Live Music Hall Koln 1992 is a live album by Richard Marx released exclusively in Germany. The concert was recorded at the Live Music Hall in Cologne, Germany.

Track listing
 Intro / "Playing with Fire"
 "Satisfied"
 "Edge of a Broken Heart"
 Intro
 "Keep Coming Back"
 Time for a Joke
 "Hands in Your Pocket"
 Intro to "Should've Known Better"
 "Should've Known Better"
 Intro to "Hazard"
 "Hazard"
 "Take This Heart"
 "Angelia"
 "Endless Summer Nights"
 Band Intro
 "Nothing You Can Do About It"
 "Too Late to Say Goodbye"
 "Don't Mean Nothing"

Richard Marx albums
Albums produced by Richard Marx
1992 live albums